Piz Corvatsch is a mountain in the Bernina Range of the Alps, overlooking Lake Sils and Lake Silvaplana in the Engadin region of the canton of Graubünden. Aside from Piz Corvatsch, two other slightly lower summits make up the Corvatsch massif: Piz Murtèl (north of Piz Corvatsch) and the unnamed summit where lies the Corvatsch upper cable car station (north of Piz Murtèl). Politically, the summit of Piz Corvatsch is shared between the municipalities of Sils im Engadin/Segl and Samedan, although the 3,303 m high summit lies between the municipalities of Silvaplana and Samedan. The tripoint between the aforementioned municipalities is the summit of Piz Murtèl.

Several glaciers lie on the east side on the massif. The largest, below Piz Corvatsch, is named Vadret dal Murtèl. The second largest, below Piz Murtèl and the station, is named Vadret dal Corvatsch.

The Corvatsch cable car starts above the village of Surlej, east of Silvaplana and culminates at 3,298 m. From there, the summit of Piz Corvatsch can be reached by traversing Piz Murtèl. In winter and spring, the mountain is part of a ski area, which is amongst the highest in Switzerland and the Eastern Alps.

Climate
Piz Corvatsch has an alpine tundra climate (ET) with long, cold winters lasting most of the year and a brief period during summer where the average daily highs rise above freezing.

See also
List of mountains of Switzerland accessible by public transport
List of buildings and structures in Switzerland above 3000 m

References 

 Collomb, Robin, Bernina Alps, Goring: West Col Productions, 1988

External links 

 The Corvatsch ski area and cable car
 Piz Corvatsch on Hikr

Bernina Range
Mountains of Switzerland
Mountains of Graubünden
Engadin
Mountains of the Alps
Alpine three-thousanders
Tourist attractions in Switzerland
Cable cars in Switzerland
Samedan